The Ducati Superquadro engine is a 90° V-twin four-stroke motorcycle engine made by Ducati since 2011. It has Ducati's signature desmodromic valve system, with four valves per cylinder and gear/chain driven double overhead camshafts.

This was followed in 2013 by a smaller ,  version, used in the 899 Panigale.

Unlike the belt-driven overhead cams of earlier Ducati engines the Superquadro's uses gears and a chain. As with most Ducatis, the engine is a stressed member, making the bike smaller and lighter than a conventionally framed motorcycle. The engines are of aluminum with Cermetal bore plating, a hardening process developed by the Italian company Tecnol which is similar to Nikasil. A 1299 version of the engine has been made for the 2017 Ducati 1299 Superleggera model.

References

External links

Superquadro
V-twin engines